Claudio Sala (born 8 September 1947) is a former Italian footballer, manager and current commentator, who played as a winger.

Club career

He made his debut for Monza, later moving to Napoli, Torino and Genoa. In total he played 323 matches and scored 27 goals in the Serie A. With Torino, he won the 1975–76 Serie A, and the 1970–71 Coppa Italia.

International career
He also earned 18 caps for the Italy national football team, including playing in the 1978 FIFA World Cup, where Italy finished in fourth place after reaching the semi-final.

Style of play
Nicknamed "il poeta del gol" ("the goal poet," in Italian), Sala was usually deployed as a winger, but could also play as an attacking midfielder, or even as a main or supporting striker on occasion. Regarded as one of Italy's greatest wingers, he was a quick, powerful, and highly creative player, and an excellent assist provider. He had good technical ability, as well as accurate passing and crossing ability, which allowed him to be an effective playmaker. As a two-footed player, he was capable of attacking on either wing, and was known for his ability to get past his opponents and deliver balls into the penalty area from the touchline.

Honours

Club
Torino
Serie A: 1975–76
Coppa Italia: 1970–71
Monza
Serie C: 1966–67

Individual
Guerin d'Oro: 1976, 1977
Torino F.C. Hall of Fame: 2016

References

1947 births
Living people
Sportspeople from the Metropolitan City of Milan
Italian footballers
Italy international footballers
Association football midfielders
Association football forwards
1978 FIFA World Cup players
Serie A players
Serie B players
A.C. Monza players
S.S.C. Napoli players
Torino F.C. players
Genoa C.F.C. players
People from Brianza
U.S. Catanzaro 1929 managers
Footballers from Lombardy